Lewis Shaw (1910–1987) was a British actor.

Selected filmography
 Confessions (1925)
 Carry On (1927)
 Zero (1928)
 The Marriage Bond (1932)
 The King's Cup (1932)
 Strange Evidence (1933)
 Early to Bed (1933)
 Open All Night (1934)
 Flat Number Three (1934)
 The Night Club Queen (1934)
 Are You a Mason? (1934)
 The Rocks of Valpre (1935)
 Once a Thief (1935)
 Death on the Set (1935)

References

Bibliography
 Holmstrom, John. The Moving Picture Boy: An International Encyclopaedia from 1895 to 1995, Norwich, Michael Russell, 1996, pp. 43–44.

External links

1910 births
1987 deaths
English male film actors
Male actors from London
20th-century English male actors